Júlia Belard (full name: Júlia Corrêa Mendes Mantero Belard; born 25 October 1988 in Lisbon) is a Portuguese actress.

Life and career
In her early years, Belard appeared in commercials and worked as a photographic model. Later she studied at the Faculty of Fine Arts of the University of Lisbon. As an actress, she is best known for her roles in Portuguese telenovelas.

Television work
2007/2008: Morangos com Açúcar (as Raquel Gameiro)
2009/2010: Deixa Que Te Leve (as Graça Coelho)
2010/2011: Mar de Paixão (as Dalila Ribeiro)
2011/2012: Anjo Meu (as Carolina Oliveira / Camila)
2012/2013: Doida Por Ti (as Gabriela Matos)
2014/2015: Mulheres (as Carla Proença)

References

External links
 

1988 births
Living people
21st-century Portuguese actresses
Actresses from Lisbon
Portuguese television actresses
University of Lisbon alumni